Roger Cuzol (18 August 1916 – 19 February 1962) was a French middle-distance runner. He competed in the men's 3000 metres steeplechase at the 1936 Summer Olympics.

References

1916 births
1962 deaths
Athletes (track and field) at the 1936 Summer Olympics
French male middle-distance runners
French male steeplechase runners
Olympic athletes of France
Place of birth missing